Neil McLean (4 August 1857–5 May 1939) was a New Zealand public works contractor and sportsman. He was born on Cape Breton Island, Nova Scotia, Canada on 4 August 1857.

References

1857 births
1939 deaths
Canadian emigrants to New Zealand
New Zealand sportsmen